The Pass of Brander stone signals, also known as Anderson's Piano, are a series of railway signals situated in the Pass of Brander, between  and  stations on the Oban branch of the West Highland Line in Scotland. A screen of wires, linked to semaphore signals, are erected on the mountainside alongside the railway. In the event of one or more wires being broken, signals in each direction are automatically placed at 'danger'.

Function 
A screen of wires is erected on the mountainside alongside the railway, and linked to semaphore signals. The wires are what holds the signals in the "clear" position. In the event of one or more wires being broken, signals in each direction will automatically fall to the 'danger' position, thus providing advance warning to train crews about possible rocks on the track ahead and/or other damage caused by rockfalls. 

Signals are erected at intervals of approximately a quarter mile (400 m) along the affected area and there are seventeen signals in all. They are numbered from "1" to "17", with signal 1 being at the east (Dalmally) end. All except number 9 stand on the south side of the line. All the signals apart from numbers 1 and 17 carry two semaphore arms, one for each direction.

History
The railway through the Pass of Brander was opened in July 1880, as part of the Callander and Oban Railway (C&OR). Since the line's opening, rocks falling from the steep slopes of Ben Cruachan onto the track had threatened to cause a derailment, and in 1881 a falling boulder hit a train. In response, the secretary of the C&OR, John Anderson, devised a system that would detect falling rocks and provide a warning to drivers.

The initial system was used from January 1882 and comprised four signals covering  of line. The final extension, at the west end, was made in September 1913, increasing the length to the current .

The system has given early warning of many boulders on the track, but two derailments have occurred where boulders evaded the screen: on 8 August 1946, when the fall occurred just as the train approached, too late for signals to give a warning, and 6 June 2010, when the fall started below the wires.

Name 
The name 'Anderson's Piano', derives from the inventor of the signals and the humming noise that the tensioned screen wires are said to make in the wind. In 2021, the system was awarded a Red Wheels Plaque by the National Transport Trust in recognition of it being a site of historical importance to transport heritage in the United Kingdom.

Other systems
Although trip wires working with colour light signals are occasionally used alongside railways in the vicinity of airports, and are common in railroads running through the Rocky Mountains and similar areas around the world, the Pass of Brander system is much older and entirely mechanical in operation.

See also 
 Railway slide fence
 Falls of Cruachan derailment

References

External links 
 https://www.railsigns.uk/info/stonesig1.html details of the signalling
Stone signals in the Pass of Brander description and photograph

After 140 years, this old technology still keeps trains safe - Tom Scott's YouTube video 

Railway signalling in the United Kingdom
Transport in Argyll and Bute
Rail transport in Scotland